Public Health Wales (PHW) is an NHS Trust which was established on 1 October 2009 as part of a major restructuring of the health service in Wales. It aims to protect and improve health and wellbeing and reduce health inequalities in Wales.

Mission and resources
The Trust has four statutory functions:

Provide and manage public health, health protection, healthcare improvement, health advisory, child protection and microbiological laboratory services and services relating to the surveillance, prevention and control of communicable diseases;
Develop and maintain arrangements for making information about matters related to the protection and improvement of health in Wales available to the public; to undertake and commission research into such matters and to contribute to the provision and development of training in such matters;
Undertake the systematic collection, analysis and dissemination of information about the health of the people of Wales in particular including cancer incidence, mortality and survival; and prevalence of congenital anomalies; and
Provide, manage, monitor, evaluate and conduct research into screening of health conditions and screening of health related matters.

For 2018/19 Public Health Wales employed 1,651 staff across Wales, with an income of £135million.

Structure
A board is responsible for Public Health Wales’ strategic direction, governance framework, organisational culture and development and stakeholder relations. It comprises a chair, six non-executive directors and five executive directors, led by a chief executive. Jan Williams OBE FRSPH is the Chair.

The executive directors and three other board-level directors make up the executive team, which manages Public Health Wales.
Each year Public Health Wales is required to conduct a self-assessment and demonstrate improvement against the Healthcare Standards for Wales.

The organisation is split into seven key directorates:
Health and Well-being
Public Health Services
Policy, Research and International Development
Quality, Nursing and Allied Health Professionals
Operations and Finance
People and Organisational Development
NHS Quality Improvement and Patient Safety/1000 Lives

References

External links
Public Health Wales

NHS Wales
Welsh NHS trusts
Public health organizations
National public health agencies
Public health in the United Kingdom